George Miller (1886 – after 1910) was a Scottish footballer who made 22 appearances in the Football League playing for Lincoln City as a left half.

References

1886 births
Year of death missing
Footballers from North Lanarkshire
Scottish footballers
Association football wing halves
Lincoln City F.C. players
English Football League players
Date of birth missing
Place of death missing
Scottish Junior Football Association players
Larkhall United F.C. players